Islamabad United in 2016 played in the inaugural season of the Pakistan Super League, a franchise based Twenty20 cricket competition held in the United Arab Emirates. The team won the 2016 competition after finishing third in the group stage and qualifying for the play off rounds.

Background
Islamabad United is a franchise cricket team which nominally represents the capital city of Pakistan, Islamabad. The team plays in the Pakistan Super League which, in 206, took place in the United Arab Emirates. The franchise is owned by Leonine Global Sports, a UAE based company, which bought it for US$15 Million for a 10-year period in 2015.

Team anthem
The 2016 team anthem, Chakka Choka, was written, composed and sung by Ali Zafar. It  was released on 30 January 2016 with a music video released on 8 February 2016.

Squad 

Players with international caps before the start of the 2016 PSL season are listed in bold.

Season summary

After a poor start to the 2016 Pakistan Super League tournament Islamabad United finished third in the round robin group stage, qualifying for the knock out stage of the tournament. The team won four matches out of eight, finishing with eight points from their group games.

They faced fourth placed Karachi Kings in the eliminator, winning by nine wickets thanks to Mohammad Sami's man of the match performance of five wickets for eight runs from four overs. Brad Haddin and Dwayne Smith each scored fifties as United achieved their target of111 in the 15th over.

In the second qualifier match Islamabad met Peshawar Zalmi. Sharjeel Khan scored 117 from 62 balls, the first century scored in the Pakistan Super League. It proved to be the difference between the teams as United posted 176 for 3 and Zalmi were bowled out for 126 with two full overs to go. United, spinner Imran Khalid took four wickets for 20 runs and Andre Russell three for 37. The win took United through to the final against Quetta Gladiators.

The 2016 Pakistan Super League Final was won by Islamabed by six wickets. United opted to bowl first after winning the toss and the Gladiators scored 174–7 in their 20 overs. Andre Russell, who finished the tournament as the leading wicket-taker, took three for 37. In reply United started well with Dwayne Smith scoring 73 runs and Brad Haddin with an unbeaten 61, allowing United to score 174 for four with eight balls remaining and winning the title alongside Cash Price of  $500,000.

Matches

References

2016 Pakistan Super League
United in 2016
2016